Louis of Hungary may refer to:

Louis I of Hungary (king 1342–1382)
Louis II of Hungary (king 1516–1526)